Engagement is the relationship between two people who intend to marry.

Engagement may also refer to:

 Engagement (diplomacy), public diplomacy, communication and foreign aid
 Engagement (marketing), meaningful interaction between a consumer and a brand
 Engagement (military), the use of a munition, weapon or decoy to carry out an offensive or defensive action
 Engagement (pregnancy), the movement of a baby's head into the pelvic cavity
 The Engagement (1647), an agreement between King Charles I and a faction of the Scottish Covenanters during the First English Civil War
 Engagement letter between a client and an accounting or legal firm
 Employee engagement, a measure of an employee's positive or negative emotional attachment to their job, colleagues and organization
 Social engagement, a measure of one's engagement with a community or society
 Student engagement, students' involvement, participation, and interaction with their work, learning, and school community
 "The Engagement" (The Golden Girls)
 "The Engagement" (Seinfeld)
 The Engagement (book), 2021 book by Sasha Issenberg

See also

 Rules of Engagement (disambiguation)
 Disengagement (disambiguation)
 Engage (disambiguation)
 Engaged (disambiguation)